James J. Frawley (1867 – September 1, 1926) was an American politician from New York.

Life

Frawley was a member of the New York State Senate (20th D.) from 1903 to 1914, sitting in the 126th, 127th, 128th, 129th, 130th, 131st, 132nd, 133rd, 134th, 135th, 136th and 137th New York State Legislatures.

Frawley was a member of the New York State Commission for the Panama–Pacific International Exposition in 1915.

He was a member of Tammany Hall.

Death
He died on September 1, 1926,  while on vacation in Dixville Notch, New Hampshire, after a heart attack.

References

Democratic Party New York (state) state senators
1867 births
1926 deaths
People from Manhattan